Emily Marie Nemmers (born July 9, 1981) is an American music artist, who performs and records under the name Emily West. Signed to Capitol Records Nashville, she debuted on Billboard's Hot Country Songs charts in early 2008 with the single "Rocks in Your Shoes". This song peaked at No. 39 early in the year, and is the first single from a self-titled EP. She entered the country charts a second time with "Blue Sky", a duet with Keith Urban, in 2010.

In 2012, West guest-starred in Body of Proof.
In 2014, she competed on the 9th season of America's Got Talent, where she finished as the runner up to magician Mat Franco. Since her success on the show, West has toured extensively throughout the United States, first with her one-woman show and then with America's Got Talent Live: The All-Stars Tour!

Early life
West, the youngest of four children, was born in Waterloo, Iowa. In July 1994 her parents took her to Bird-On-Fire Recording Studio in West Union, Iowa where studio owner Doug Koempel worked with her producing four demos: "Sweet Dreams", "Piece Of My Heart", "Higher Love" and "Me And Bobby McGee."  She moved to Nashville, Tennessee in 2000 following her graduation from Waterloo West High School in hopes of achieving her goals of becoming a country music singer. West soon signed a deal with a publishing company in Nashville, Warner-Chapell. West was then signed to Capitol Records Nashville when producer Mike Dungan listened to her demo tapes. One of her first appearances was as a background vocalist on Chely Wright's 2005 album The Metropolitan Hotel.

Career

2007–2012: Music and television
Capitol released a self-titled EP December 11, 2007, to the iTunes music store. In early 2008, West was featured in People magazine and completed a media tour for her debut single, "Rocks in Your Shoes". "Rocks in Your Shoes" peaked in the Top 40 on the Billboard Hot Country Songs chart in early 2008. A second single, "That Kind of Happy" was released in April 2009 and failed to enter the chart.

West appeared on Are You Smarter Than a 5th Grader? on September 25, 2009, winning $25,000. In January 2010, West released a duet with labelmate Keith Urban titled "Blue Sky." The song debuted at No. 53 on the Hot Country Songs chart for the week of February 23, 2010. Roughstock gave the song 4½ stars out of 5, stating that Blue Sky' is already a contender for one of 2010's best singles." It spent thirteen weeks on the charts and peaked at No. 38.

Emily appeared in the April 18, 2010, episode of Celebrity Apprentice, as the "music make-over" target for the women's team led by Cyndi Lauper. Lauper won the challenge and as a result West donated 100% of the first month of iTunes sales of her song "Blue Sky" to the Stonewall Community Foundation, Lauper's charity.

She appeared in the January 10, 2012 "Shades of Blue" episode on Body of Proof on ABC. She played a drug addict trying to make it in the music business. She sings her single "Head On" at the end of the episode: Season 2 episode 12 in "Body of Proof." She shows herself to be a terrific actress & singer.

2014–present: America's Got Talent
In 2014, West competed on  the 9th season of America's Got Talent, advancing to the finals. She finished in second place.

Shortly after the show ended, West signed a record deal with Sony Masterworks, and is set to release a two-track single on December 2, 2014; and an album in 2015.

On April 6, 2015, the first single, called "Bitter", off her upcoming album "All For You" was released, and the album was released in August 2015.

Performances and results

Discography

Studio albums

Extended plays

Singles

Music videos

References

External links
 Emily West at Capitol Records Nashville

1981 births
21st-century American singers
Living people
American women country singers
American country singer-songwriters
Capitol Records artists
People from Waterloo, Iowa
America's Got Talent contestants
21st-century American women singers
Country musicians from Iowa
Singer-songwriters from Iowa